Talavera is a Spanish toponymic surname which comes from Talavera de la Reina in the Toledo province of Spain. This surname is occasionally borne as a Sephardic Jewish surname.

Notable people with this surname
 Alfredo Talavera (born 1982), Mexican footballer
 Francisco Ibáñez Talavera (born 1936), Spanish comic book artist and writer
 Francisco Javier Errázuriz Talavera (born 1942), Chilean businessman and politician
 Hernando de Talavera (1428-1507), confessor of Queen Isabella, and the Catholic Archbishop of Granada
 Hugo Ricardo Talavera (born 1949), Paraguayan footballer
 Juan Andrés Fontaine Talavera, Chilean cabinet minister
 Tracee Talavera (born 1966), Mexican-American gymnast

See also
 Talavera (disambiguation)

References

Spanish-language surnames